Charles Hanbury-Tracy, 1st Baron Sudeley (28 December 1778 – 10 February 1858), known as Charles Hanbury until 1798 and as Charles Hanbury Tracy from 1798 to 1838, was a British Whig politician.

Early life
Hanbury-Tracy was born on 28 December 1778. He was the third son of John Hanbury of Pontypool Park in Monmouthshire. The family derived its wealth from its ownership of the Pontypool Ironworks. He was educated at Rugby School (1790) and matriculated at Christ Church, Oxford on 1 February 1796.

Career
Hanbury-Tracy was appointed High Sheriff of Gloucestershire for 1800–01 and High Sheriff of Montgomeryshire for 1804–05. He was elected to the House of Commons for Tewkesbury in 1807 in the Whig interest, a seat he held until 1812 and again from 1832 to 1837.

Hanbury-Tracy served as the Chairman of the Commission to judge the designs for the new Houses of Parliament in 1835. In 1838 Hanbury-Tracy was raised to the peerage as Baron Sudeley, of Toddington in the County of Gloucester. He later served as Lord Lieutenant of Montgomeryshire between 1848 and 1858.

Personal life and death
Hanbury-Tracy married his cousin the Hon. Henrietta Susanna Tracy, only child of Henry Leigh Tracy, 8th Viscount Tracy by Susannah Weaver, on 29 December 1798. Five days before the marriage he assumed by Royal licence the additional surname of Tracy. 

Through this marriage, the ancient estate of Toddington Manor in Gloucestershire came into the Hanbury family. Lord Sudeley at first had the original house renovated, but later constructed a new house in Gothic style nearby. Later still in the 1840s he was responsible for the rebuilding of Gregynog Hall in Montgomeryshire.  

Lady Sudeley died on 5 June 1839. Lord Sudeley survived her by 19 years and died in February 1858, aged 79. He was succeeded in the barony by his son Thomas, who also succeeded him as Lord Lieutenant of Montgomeryshire. Sudeley's younger son the Honourable Henry was a politician.
They had issue:
 Hon Henrietta Hanbury-Tracy
 Thomas Hanbury-Tracy, 2nd Baron Sudeley
 Hon Henry Hanbury-Tracy (1802–1889), MP for Bridgnorth

Hanbury-Tracy died on 10 February 1858.

Notes

References
 
Kidd, Charles, Williamson, David (editors). Debrett's Peerage and Baronetage (1990 edition). New York: St Martin's Press, 1990,

External links 
 

1778 births
1858 deaths
People from Pontypool
People educated at Rugby School
Alumni of Christ Church, Oxford
Barons in the Peerage of the United Kingdom
Lord-Lieutenants of Montgomeryshire
Members of the Parliament of the United Kingdom for English constituencies
UK MPs 1807–1812
UK MPs 1832–1835
UK MPs 1835–1837
UK MPs who were granted peerages
High Sheriffs of Gloucestershire
High Sheriffs of Montgomeryshire
Peers of the United Kingdom created by Queen Victoria
Hanbury-Tracy family